Francesco Giubilei (born 1 January 1992) is an Italian publisher, columnist and conservative writer. Since 2022, he is a special advisor for the Italian Minister of Culture Gennaro Sangiuliano.

Early life 
Giubilei was born in Cesena, the son of two doctors: his father, a surgeon, is from Gualdo Tadino, while his mother, a pediatrician, was born in Venezuela to a family of Italian immigrants. Because of that, he speaks fluent Spanish.

He took a bachelor's degree in Modern Literature at Roma Tre University, and a master's degree in Culture and History of publishing enterprises at the University of Milan. Besides, he attended summer schools at the London School of Journalism and the Cuny Graduate School in New York.

He wrote his first book, Giovinezza. Partitura per mandolino e canto, when he was 13 years old, and he published it at the age of 15. In 2007, he won the first prize at the literary contest Titano 2007 with his short story La terza porta.

Career 
At the age of 16, he founded his first publishing house, Historica Edizioni, in September 2008. In 2013, he founded a second publishing house, Giubilei Regnani Editore, with businessman Giorgio Regnani.

He has worked as a contributor for several media outlets, including Il Giornale, Il Messaggero, Linkiesta, La Voce di Romagna and The American Conservative. He has also founded his own magazines and online newspapers, such as Scrivendo volo, Cultora, Atlantico Quotidiano and Nazione Futura (the last one is also the name of a political movement he founded in 2017).

From 2013 to 2016, with Historica he has been founder and leading organizer of the Fiera del libro della Romagna, a Cesena-based indipendent book festival.

Since 2017, Giubilei is adjunct professor at the Università degli Studi Giustino Fortunato.

Since January 2018, he is the president of the Tatarella Foundation, founded in memory to Italian politician Giuseppe Tatarella. He was a member of the Scientific Committee on the Future of Europe of the Italian government.

In 2019, he has been listed by Forbes among the 100 most influential Under-30 people in Italy. While in 2020, he was listed among the 5 best young journalists in Italy.

His books have been translated into English, Spanish, Serbian and Hungarian.

Personal life
Francesco Giubilei currently resides in Rome.

Bibliography 
 Giovinezza. Partitura per mandolino e canto, Il Ponte Vecchio, 2007.
 Bastola. La signora del fuoco, ARPAnet, 2008.
 Chi è Charlie?, Historica Edizioni, 2011.
 I Giovani e la letteratura, Historica Edizioni, 2013.
 Leo Longanesi. Il borghese conservatore, Odoya, 2015.
 Perché le élite ci salveranno dal populismo. All'Italia non serve l'antipolitica ma la buona politica, Società Europea di Edizioni, 2015.
 Storia del pensiero conservatore. Dalla Rivoluzione francese ai giorni nostri, Giubilei Regnani, 2016. (translated in English by Regnery Publishing with the title The History of European Conservative Thought).
 I riferimenti culturali della Lega di Salvini, Historica Edizioni, 2018.
 Storia della cultura di destra. Dal dopoguerra al governo giallo-verde, Giubilei Regnani, 2018.
 Europa sovranista. Da Salvini alla Meloni, da Orbán alla Le Pen, Giubilei Regnani, 2019.
 Conservare la natura. Perché l'ambiente è un tema caro alla destra e ai conservatori, Giubilei Regnani, 2020.
 Giorgia Meloni. La rivoluzione dei conservatori, Giubilei Regnani, 2020.
 Strapaese. L'Italia dei paesi e delle chiese di campagna. Da Maccari a Longanesi, da Papini a Soffici, Odoya, 2021.
 Sovranità energetica. Dagli errori della transizione ecologica alla guerra in Ucraina, Giubilei Regnani, 2022.

References

1992 births
People from Cesena
Conservatism in Italy
Italian columnists
Italian essayists
Italian male journalists
Italian magazine editors
Italian people of Venezuelan descent
Italian political writers
Italian publishers (people)
21st-century Italian novelists
Italian male novelists
Roma Tre University alumni
University of Milan alumni
Living people